Rajghat may refer to:
Raj Ghat and associated memorials - memorial to Mahatma Gandhi in Delhi
Rajghat, Gorakhpur (U.P.), where Ram Prasad Bismil was cremated in 1927
Rajghat Dam
Rajghat, Kanchanpur, Nepal
Rajghat, Janakpur, Nepal
Rajghat, Kosi, Nepal
 For the 1805 Anglo-Maratha treaty signed at Rajghat see Yashwantrao Holkar